"S.O.S." is a song by the English new wave and synth-pop band ABC. It was released in early 1984 as the second single from their second studio album, Beauty Stab (1983). It peaked at No. 39 on the UK Singles Chart.

Track listing
"S.O.S." – 4:48
"United Kingdom" – 3:19

Chart performance

References

External links
 

1984 singles
ABC (band) songs
Songs written by Martin Fry
1983 songs
Mercury Records singles
Songs written by Mark White (musician)
Songs written by Stephen Singleton
Song recordings produced by Gary Langan